Liolaemus abaucan is a species of lizard in the family  Liolaemidae. It is native to Argentina.

References

abaucan
Reptiles described in 1993
Reptiles of Argentina
Taxa named by Richard Emmett Etheridge